Gaius Asinius Nicomachus Julianus (c. 185 – aft. or c. 230) was the Proconsul of Asia between c. 225 and c. 230. He was the son of Gaius Asinius Protimus Quadratus, Proconsul in Achaea in 220.

References

Further reading
 Christian Settipani, Continuite Gentilice et Continuite Familiale Dans Les Familles Senatoriales Romaines, A L'Epoque Imperiale, Mythe et Realite. Linacre, UK: Prosopographica et Genealogica, 2000.

2nd-century Romans
3rd-century Romans
Roman governors of Asia
Nicomachus Julianus, Gaius
180s births
3rd-century deaths
Year of death unknown
Year of birth uncertain